This is a list of FM and OIRT FM Band radio stations based in Belarus. By law, FM radiostations have to rotate music made in Belarus 75% of broadcasting time. Mostly FM stations broadcast in Russian.

National State Radio 

The National State Television and Radio Company of the Republic of Belarus is the state television and radio broadcasting service in Belarus.

 First Channel (FM and UKV)
 Channel "Culture" (FM and UKV)
 Radius-FM (FM in Belarus and 72,11 UKV in Minsk)
 Radio "Stolitsa" (FM and UKV)

Regional stations:
 Radio Brest (FM and UKV)
 Radio Vitebsk (FM and UKV)
 Gomel FM (FM and UKV)
 Radio Grodno (FM and UKV)
 Radio Mogilev (FM and UKV)

Local stations:
 Homiel plus (Homiel - 103.7 FM)
 Gorod FM (Brest - 97.7 FM)

International station:
 Radio Station "Belarus" (Internet, satellite and FM (Brest - 96.4 FM, Hrodna - 96.9 FM, Heraneny - 99.0 FM, Svislach - 100.8 FM, Miadel - 102.0 FM, Braslau - 106.6 FM))

Other state radio stations 
 ONT state broadcasting:
 Center FM
 MIR state broadcasting:
 Radio MIR - Belarus
 Energy FM (Miensk - 100.4 FM and Braslau - 97.4 FM)
 Radio Minsk (Government of Minsk city)
 Minskaya volna (Government of Minsk region) (FM-network in Minsk region)
 Compass FM (Miensk - 102.5 FM) (Ministry of Defence)
 Alpha Radio (State newspaper "Soviet Belarus" (SB))
 Radio Unistar (Belarus state university and MediaInvest GmbH)
 Federation of Trade Unions of Belarus:
 Novoe Radio
 Narodnoe radio
 Belarusian Republican Youth Union:
 Pilot FM
 Dushevnoe radio
 "Russian Radio" Holding (Ministry of Information of Belarus - 34%):
 Russian Radio Belarus (Miensk - 98.9 FM, Babruisk - 98.0 FM, Mahilou - 98.6 FM)
 Radio ROKS Belarus
 ″Trio Media″ holding (affiliated with the state):
 Radio Humor FM - Belarus
 Autoradio
 Radio Relax
 ″Vladimir Grevtsov Agency″:
 Legendy FM
 Europa Plus network:
 Europa Plus Belarus (Miensk - 92.8 FM & FM-network in Vitsebsk region)
 Retro FM Belarus (Miensk 96.9 FM, Vitsebsk - 104.6 FM, Polatsk - 104.7 FM)
 "BA - International" joint venture (currently off-air) (Ministry of Information of Belarus - 34%):
 Radio BA
 Melodii Veka (Miensk - 96.2 FM)

Local radio stations 
 Pravda radio (FM-network in Homiel region)
 Radio 107,4 FM (Homiel - 107.4 FM, Zhlobyn - 107.6 FM)
 Radio Ranak (Svetlogorsk - 88.4 FM)
 Nelly - info (Mozyr - 102.7 FM)
 Maladechna FM (Maladechna - 89.2 FM)
 Radio Delta (Vitsebsk - 89.5 FM)
 Radio Naftan (Navapolacak - 98.1 FM)
 Radio Skif (Vorsha - 99.9 FM, Babruisk - 91.4 FM)
 Zefir FM (Babruisk - 95.4 FM)
 Baranovichi FM (Baranavichy - 100.0 FM)
 Svoyo radio (Pinsk - 106.1 FM)
 MFM (Hrodna - 105.0 FM)
 Lider FM (Lida - 94.3 FM)
 Tvoe radio (Lida - 100.6 FM)

Independent radio stations 

 Radio Svaboda - satellite and Internet station. Premiere one-hour radio program airs every evening.
 Radio Racyja - 98.1 FM & 99.2 FM and Internet station. Music programs also retranslation in Euroradio on week-end
 Euroradio - Satellite and Internet station, also retranslation on weekdays in Radio Racyja and Radio Znad Wilii (Vilnius 103.8 FM), and every day in Perec FM (Dubrovytsia 107.5 FM) 
 Radyjo Ŭnet (Радыё Ўнэт) - morning and night Belarusian programms in polish station Radio Wnet. Broadcasts on weekdays. Night programs retranslation on weekdays in Radio Znad Wilii, weekly half-hour programm retranslation on Thursdays at 20:15 in Latvijas radio 4 (FM-network in Latvia)
 Polish radio Belarusian service - 1386 AM every morning, satellite and Internet, also retranslation in Radio Znad Wilii and Radio Poland DAB+ (daily half-hour program at 15:30 in DAB+ schedule)
 Radio Maria Belarus - Internet station
 Vatican Radio Belarusian Service - shortwave, satellite and Internet station, also retranslation in Radio Racyja and Radio Maria Belarus
 Trans World Radio Belarus - 1035 AM, 621 AM and Internet station
 MEGA, an internet radio station

See also 
 Media of Belarus

References

Media in Belarus

Belarus